Inti is a genus of orchids native to South America and Central America. It has only two known species:

Inti bicallosa (Rchb.f.) M.A.Blanco - Costa Rica, Panama, Colombia, Ecuador, Peru
Inti chartacifolia (Ames & C.Schweinf.) M.A.Blanco  - Costa Rica, Panama, Colombia, Ecuador, Peru

Inti should not be confused with the bryophyte genus Intia.

References

Maxillariinae genera
Orchids of Central America
Orchids of South America
Maxillariinae